Carl Dooler (30 March 1943  – 29 July 2010) was an English professional rugby league footballer who played in the 1960s and 1970s. He played at representative level for Great Britain (non-Test matches), and Yorkshire, and at club level for Sharlston Rovers ARLFC, Featherstone Rovers (Heritage № 415), Hull Kingston Rovers, York and Batley, as an occasional goal-kicking , i.e. number 7.

Background
Carl Dooler's birth was registered in Lower Agbrigg district, Wakefield, West Riding of Yorkshire, England, he worked as a miner, construction worker , and a rigger, and he died aged 67 in North Shields, Tyne and Wear.

Playing career

International honours
Carl Dooler represented Great Britain while at Featherstone Rovers on the 1966 Great Britain Lions tour of Australia and New Zealand in fifteen  non-Test matches.

County honours
Carl Dooler won caps for Yorkshire while at Featherstone Rovers; during the 1962–63 season against Cumberland and Lancashire, and during the 1967–68 season against Australia.

Challenge Cup Final appearances
Carl Dooler played , scored a drop goal, and was man of the match winning the Lance Todd Trophy in Featherstone Rovers' 17-12 victory over Barrow in the 1966–67 Challenge Cup Final during the 1966–67 season at Wembley Stadium, London on Saturday 13 May 1967, in front of a crowd of 76,290.

County Cup Final appearances
Carl Dooler played  and was sent off for tripping an opponent (later found not guilty by the disciplinary panel) in Featherstone Rovers' 12-25 defeat by Hull Kingston Rovers in the 1966–67 Yorkshire County Cup Final during the 1966–67 season at Headingley Rugby Stadium, Leeds on Saturday 15 October 1966.

Club career
Carl Dooler made his début for Featherstone Rovers on Saturday 3 December 1960, he appears to have scored no drop-goals (or field-goals as they are currently known in Australasia), but prior to the 1974–75 season all goals, whether; conversions, penalties, or drop-goals, scored 2-points, consequently prior to this date drop-goals were often not explicitly documented, therefore '0' drop-goals may indicate drop-goals not recorded, rather than no drop-goals scored.

Honoured at Featherstone Rovers
Carl Dooler is a Featherstone Rovers Hall of Fame inductee.

Genealogical information
Carl Dooler was the cousin of the rugby league footballer; Vaughan Thomas.

References

External links
Search for "Dooler" at rugbyleagueproject.org
Carl Dooler: Scrum-half whose skills took Featherstone to victory in the 1967 Challenge Cup final
Carl Dooler at marklaspalmas.blogspot.co.uk
(archived by archive.is) Obituary Carl Dooler - 1967 Lance Todd Trophy Winner

1943 births
2010 deaths
Batley Bulldogs players
English rugby league players
Featherstone Rovers players
Great Britain national rugby league team players
Hull Kingston Rovers players
Lance Todd Trophy winners
People from Sharlston
Rugby league halfbacks
Rugby league players from Wakefield
York Wasps players
Yorkshire rugby league team players